St. Mary's Minor Seminary is a Catholic senior secondary boarding school in Zambia, run by the Roman Catholic Diocese of Chipata.

History and operations
The school is sometimes called new St. Mary's because it is the second seminary after the sale of the St. Mary's which was situated along Malawi Road. The new seminary was opened in 1980 by late Cardinal Medardo Joseph Mazombwe, then-Bishop of the Chipata Diocese, with the sole aim of raising up young men that would proceed to the Major seminary to pursue diocesan priesthood.

Symbols
 The chapel symbolises the centrality of prayer and all spiritual activities of the seminary.
 The hoe symbolises the hard work that the boys should cultivate.
 The chalice and the Eucharist: celebration of Mass that should be the centre of life of every seminarian and a reminder that he is called to be a priest to offer mass for the people.
 Motto: Ora et Labora ("Pray and Work")

See also

 Education in Zambia
 List of boarding schools
 List of Roman Catholic seminaries
 List of schools in Zambia
 Roman Catholicism in Zambia

1980 establishments in Africa
1980s establishments in Zambia
Boarding schools in Zambia
Boys' schools in Zambia
Educational institutions established in 1980
Private schools in Zambia
Catholic Church in Zambia
Catholic minor seminaries
Catholic secondary schools in Africa
Secondary schools in Zambia